Björn Joakim Persson (born 3 April 1975) is a Swedish football manager and former player. He is the head coach of Varbergs BoIS.

As a player, he represented Malmö FF, Atalanta, IFK Göteborg, Esbjerg fB, Hansa Rostock, Stabæk, and Landskrona BoIS during a career that spanned between 1992 and 2010. He also represented the Sweden national team, winning three caps and scoring one goal in 1997.

Club career
Born in Helsingborg, Persson began his career as a youth-team player with Högaborgs BK before moving to Malmö FF in 1992. He made his professional debut in a Swedish Cup game against Landskrona in 1994.

Persson moved to the Italian Serie A club Atalanta in 1996. He returned to Sweden after less than two seasons in Italy, having very rarely played for Atalanta's first-team, joining IFK Göteborg in January 1998. Things went little better for him in Sweden. He was often singled out by the media as the main cause of his team's poor performances throughout his two seasons with Göteborg. After the 1998 season he was voted as the "most overrated player" in the Allsvenskan by his fellow players.

At the end of the 1999 season, Persson left IFK Göteborg in order to escape the intense scrutiny he had been subjected to. He joined Esbjerg fB, of the Danish Superliga, midway through the league season, at the end of which they were relegated to the Danish 1st Division. Persson stayed with the club and helped them to win the first division championship, and promotion, at the first attempt.

In the summer of 2002, after one further season with Esbjerg, Persson moved to Hansa Rostock of the German Bundesliga. Along with Andreas Jakobsson, Marcus Lantz, Peter Wibrån, Magnus Arvidsson and Rade Prica, Persson was one of six Swedes playing for the Mecklenburg club. Under manager Armin Veh he played as a holding midfielder, making 26 appearances in his first season with the club. The following season began with four successive defeats, after which Veh handed in his resignation and was replaced by Juri Schlünz. Schlünz converted Persson from a midfielder into a defender and appointed him as the leader of the team's back four. After making just one substitute appearance in the first six games of the season, Persson went on to start 27 of the last 28 games. He scored his only league goal for Hansa in a 1–1 draw with Borussia Mönchengladbach on 1 November 2003. Hansa finished the season in ninth place. Persson made 30 league starts during the 2004–05 season but was unable to prevent Hansa from finishing second-bottom of the league and being relegated to the 2. Bundesliga.

Following Hansa Rostock's relegation, Persson left the club to join Stabæk in Norway's Tippeligaen. Although he had been offered a longer contract, Persson decided to return to Sweden after 18 months in Norway. Persson signed with Landskrona prior to the 2007 Superettan season.

International career
Persson made 25 appearances for the Sweden U21s, scoring eight goals. He also made five appearances for Sweden at junior level, scoring one goal.

Persson also made three appearances for the Sweden national football team, all of which came in the 1997 King's Cup. He played in games against Romania and Japan before playing in the final against the hosts Thailand. Persson scored a goal in the final, helping the Swedes to a 3–1 win.

Personal life
Persson is the father of three children.

Career statistics

International 

 Scores and results list Sweden's goal tally first, score column indicates score after each Persson goal.

Honours 
Sweden
 King's Cup: 1997

References

External links
 
 

Living people
1975 births
Sportspeople from Helsingborg
Association football defenders
Association football midfielders
Swedish footballers
Sweden international footballers
Sweden under-21 international footballers
Swedish expatriate footballers
Högaborgs BK players
Malmö FF players
Atalanta B.C. players
IFK Göteborg players
Esbjerg fB players
FC Hansa Rostock players
Stabæk Fotball players
Landskrona BoIS players
Allsvenskan players
Serie A players
Danish Superliga players
Bundesliga players
Eliteserien players
Superettan players
Expatriate footballers in Italy
Expatriate men's footballers in Denmark
Expatriate footballers in Germany
Expatriate footballers in Norway
Swedish expatriate sportspeople in Italy
Swedish expatriate sportspeople in Denmark
Swedish expatriate sportspeople in Germany
Swedish expatriate sportspeople in Norway